RC Qanot (RK Qanot)  is an Uzbek rugby club in Tashkent.

References

Uzbekistani rugby union teams
Sport in Tashkent